Amana Bank is a commercial bank in Tanzania. It is  licensed by the Bank of Tanzania, the central bank and national banking regulator.

Location
The headquarters and main branch of Amana Bank are located in Golden Jubilee Tower, along Garden Avenue, in the central business district of the city of Dar es Salaam, the largest city and financial capital of Tanzania. The geographical coordinates of Golden Jubilee Tower are: 06°48'49.0"S,  39°17'21.0"E (Latitude:-6.813611; Longitude:39.289167).

Overview
The bank is a fully licensed Islamic banking institution.  , the bank had over 34,000 customers, served through seven branches, of which five were in Dar es Salaam, one in Mwanza and one in Arusha. As of 31 December 2017, the bank's total assets were valued at TSh 204 billion (US$89.7 million), with shareholders' equity of TSh 23.7 billion (US$10.43 million).

History
Amana Bank was established in 2011 with paid-up capital of TSh 27 billion (approx. US$12.6 million in 2016 money). It is the first fully Sharia-compliant bank in Tanzania. The discussions to establish this bank date back to October 2009, among prominent Tanzanian business personalities.

Branch Network
As of September 2018, the bank maintained branches at the following locations:

 Headquarters Branch: 2nd Floor, Golden Jubilee Tower, Ohio Street, Dar es Salaam Main Branch
 Nyerere Branch: DRTC House, Nyerere Road, Dar es Salaam 
 Lumumba Branch: Lumumba Street, Kariakoo, Dar es Salaam
 Mbagala Branch: Mbagala Zakhem, Mbagala, Dar es Salaam 
 Tandamti Branch: Tandamti Street, Opposite Kariakoo Market, Dar es Salaam 
 Arusha Branch: Ground Floor, Hugo Plaza Building, Corner of Wapare Street & Majengo Street, Arusha
 Mwanza Branch: Ground Floor, Plot no 231, Block T, Kenyatta Street, Mwanza
Tanga Branch - North East side of Uhuru Park, Market Street, Tanga
 Zanzibar Branch - Zanzibar (In Development)
 Pemba Branch - Pemba (In Development)

See also

References

External links
 Amana Bank disburses TZS:36 billion in loans, as of June 2016
 Tanzania: Amana Bank Loan Portfolio Surges
 Website of Amana Bank Limited
 Website of Bank of Tanzania

Banks of Tanzania
Companies of Tanzania
Economy of Dar es Salaam
Banks established in 2011
2011 establishments in Tanzania
Dar es Salaam